The Cordilleran parakeet (Psittacara frontatus) is a long-tailed South American species of parrot.
It is found from western Ecuador to southern Peru. Its natural habitats are subtropical or tropical dry forests, subtropical or tropical moist lowland forests, subtropical or tropical moist montane forests, and especially high-altitude shrubland and forest; it is also known to visit heavily degraded former forest.

It has two subspecies:
Psittacara frontatus frontatus (Cabanis, 1846)   western Ecuador, western Peru
Psittacara frontatus minor  (Carriker, 1933)   central and southern Peru

It has historically been considered conspecific with the scarlet-fronted parakeet, and still is by some authorities (e.g., the American Ornithological Society's South American Classification Committee, the eBird/Clements checklist, and the Howard & Moore checklist).

References

Cordilleran parakeet
Cordilleran parakeet